Kenneth Gangemi (born 1937, Bronxville, New York) is an American poet and fiction writer, best known for his 1969 debut novel, Olt, which has been variously republished and translated.

In addition to publications in magazines and anthologies, he is the author of five books, three of them also published in England. Translations have appeared in French, German, Danish, and Turkish. He has had residencies at the Millay Colony for the Arts, Blue Mountain Center, and the Djerassi Resident Artists Program. He has won a Pushcart Prize, a New York State CAPS grant, and a Stegner Fellowship at Stanford University.

Published works

 Olt, a novel. London: Calder & Boyars, 1969. New York: Orion Press (an imprint of Grossman/Viking), 1969.  Paris: L'Herne, 1972. Frankfurt: März Verlag, 1977. London and New York: Marion Boyars, 1985. Copenhagen: Husets Forlag, 1991. Istanbul: Iletisim Yayinlari, 1994. Lincoln: iUniverse, 2001.
 Lydia, a collection of poetry. Los Angeles: Black Sparrow Press, 1970.
 Corroboree, humor and satire. New York: Assembling Press, 1977.
 The Volcanoes from Puebla, fiction based on living and traveling in Mexico. London and New York: Marion Boyars, 1979, 1989. Lincoln: iUniverse, 2001.
 Lydia/Corroborée, a dual volume, Lydia bilingual. Paris: Christian Bourgois, 1980.
 The Interceptor Pilot, a cinematic novel. Paris: Flammarion (Pilote de chasse), 1975. London and New York, Marion Boyars, 1980, 1982. Lincoln: iUniverse, 2001.

References

External links
 Six Stories by Kenneth Gangemi, Vice, 2008.
 WNYC Reader's Almanac, December 10, 1979. Interview with host Walter James Miller

1937 births
American male writers
Writers from New York (state)
Living people
People from the East Village, Manhattan
People from the Lower East Side
People from Scarsdale, New York